Vincent Desharnais (born May 29, 1996) is a Canadian professional ice hockey defenceman currently playing for the  Edmonton Oilers of the National Hockey League (NHL).

Playing career

Amateur
Desharnais played college hockey with Providence College from 2015 to 2019, after playing a season for the Chilliwack Chiefs of the British Columbia Hockey League (BCHL). He was a 7th round draft pick of the Edmonton Oilers in the 2016 NHL Entry Draft, in his third year of draft eligibility.

Professional
After playing three seasons of minor pro with the Wichita Thunder of the ECHL and the Bakersfield Condors of the American Hockey League (AHL), Desharnais was signed in March 2022 by the Oilers to a two year, entry-level contract.

During the  season, Desharnais was recalled by the Oilers and played his first NHL game on January 11, 2023, a 6-2 victory against the Anaheim Ducks.

Personal life 
Desharnais is the youngest in his family. His father, Jacques, and brother, Alex, have been cited by Desharnais as his hockey-playing influences.

In January 2023, 10 days after his first NHL game, Desharnais spoke about his enjoyment of the finer things his new role in the NHL has given him. In another interview, Desharnais clarified: "I waited 10 years to get my chance. I won't waste it [...] I think I'm bringing something that the team doesn't have as much, in terms of grit and intensity".

Career statistics

Regular season and playoffs

Awards and honours

Social Media 
Desharnais is very active on social media to connect with his fans. He has two Twitter accounts; (desharn13 and vdesharnais), two Instagram accounts; (desharnais_2 and desharn_2), a Facebook account and a Youtube account. Uploaded to Youtube are two videos one for an event he hosted “PC Beats Cancer” and an academic presentation "Pluto-A planet or not?".

Philanthropy 
In 2019 Desharnais was announced as a nominee for the Hockey Humanitarian Award. The award is presented annually to a NCAA student-athlete who makes significant contributions not only to his or her team but also to the community-at-large through leadership in volunteerism. Desharnais was recognized for an event he hosted, “PC Beats Cancer” an event in which over $5,100 was raised for the Gloria Gemma Foundation.

In 2020 Desharnais raised over $6,000 for the Défi Tête rasée Leucan to shave his head.

In 2022 Desharnais helped Kevin Raphael and Leucan - with his second shaved head challenge - raise over $50,000.

References

External links

1996 births
Living people
Bakersfield Condors players
Chilliwack Chiefs players
Edmonton Oilers draft picks
Edmonton Oilers players
Ice hockey people from Quebec
Providence Friars men's ice hockey players
Sportspeople from Laval, Quebec
Wichita Thunder players